The Noble M400 is a sports car from the British car maker Noble. Manufacturing was outsourced to Hi-Tech Automotive, based in Port Elizabeth, South Africa. The M400 was noted by the automotive press for its excellent handling and power.

Engine

The Noble M400 features a transversely-mounted rear mid-engine, rear-wheel-drive layout. The power plant began life as a  DOHC with 4 valves per cylinder Ford Duratec V6 engine, as used in the Ford Mondeo ST220. With this engine as a base, Noble fits high-lift camshafts, revised fuel injection, and Garrett AiResearch T28 twin-turbochargers. The M400 has no ABS, no stability control, no traction control, and no air bags. Driver safety comes from a factory racing harness and built-in roll cage.

For durability, Noble also added forged pistons, an oil cooler, a larger baffled oil sump, and extra cooling ducts. The UK automotive TV show Vroom Vroom suggested that the M400 gave Ferrari Enzo performance at a Porsche 911 price.

About
The M400 is the track variant of the M12. Its power-to-weight ratio is over 400 bhp (300 kW) per ton, and is the figure from which its model name derives. It has 425 bhp (317 kW; 431 PS) and has been reported to do 0–60 mph (0–97 km/h) in as little as 2.97 seconds. Car and Driver (March 2007) achieved a 0–60 mph time of 3.3 seconds and a 0–100 mph time of 7.52 seconds. Although often listed as 0–60 mph in 3.5 seconds, the M400 generally comes in at 3.2 seconds according to various publications and generally listed amongst the fastest accelerating cars. Noble indicates only that the car is capable of achieving 0–60 mph in under 4 seconds. Its top speed is listed as 185 mph (300 km/h). Lateral Gs are reported in excess of 1.2. It has both a 3-point seatbelt and a 5-point harness.

The most notable differences from the M12 are the use of forged pistons, T28 turbos, a front anti-roll bar, stiffer springs, different shocks, Pirelli P Zero tyres, a smoother gear shifter, and a slightly narrower central tunnel as the driver now sits a bit more central than previous models. Exterior differences remain subtle. The colour scheme tends to incorporate anthracite (Gris) wheels, rear wing supports and wing ends but some examples maintain silver wheels and supports. The front splitter is now removed (Although many owners opt to have this put on). The main change is the addition of side pods to enhance air into the system and to create a visual impact. Air conditioning was an £1,995 option and adds to the weight. The interior has an added oil gauge that resides next to the boost gauge. Additionally the Sparco Alcantara seats and finishing's differ from the other Nobles' (Alcantara is one third the weight of leather). The Noble M400 was awarded the car of the year award in 2005 by one publication. With just 75 examples made, this version is sought after and rare.

Rossion Q1

Noble no longer manufactures the M400. The exclusive dealer for Noble in the US, 1G Racing in Ohio, USA (also known as Rossion), had obtained the production rights to the M400 from Noble Automotive, and has released an updated version named Rossion Q1.

References

M400
Sports cars
Rear mid-engine, rear-wheel-drive vehicles
Cars introduced in 2004